Yoshihiro Ito may refer to:
Yoshihiro Ito (baseball), Nippon Professional Baseball player
Yoshihiro Ito (racing driver), Japanese racing driver